Yurasov is a Russian masculine surname, its feminine counterpart is Yurasova. Notable people with the surname include:

 Dmitry Yurasov (born 1964), Russian historian and human rights defender
 Vera Yurasova (1928–2023), Russian physicist

Russian-language surnames